Pierre-Percée is a commune in the Meurthe-et-Moselle department in north-eastern France.

Sites and monuments
 Château de Pierre-Percée ruins
 Lake of  Pierre-Percée

See also
Communes of the Meurthe-et-Moselle department
Antoine Sartorio

References

Pierrepercee